Lisa Lachance  is a Canadian politician, who was elected to the Nova Scotia House of Assembly in the 2021 Nova Scotia general election. She represents the riding of Halifax Citadel-Sable Island as a member of the Nova Scotia New Democratic Party.

Lachance and her partner Heather Gass were one of the first same-sex couples to be legally married in Canada following Halpern v Canada (AG). Lachance is genderqueer and uses she/they pronouns. She is the first gender non-conforming MLA in Nova Scotia, and the third overall in the nation, joining Uzoma Asagwara and Estefan Cortes-Vargas.

Electoral history

References

Year of birth missing (living people)
Living people
Lesbian politicians
People from Halifax, Nova Scotia
Politicians from Montreal
Nova Scotia New Democratic Party MLAs
Women MLAs in Nova Scotia
Canadian LGBT people in provincial and territorial legislatures
Non-binary politicians
21st-century Canadian politicians
21st-century Canadian women politicians
21st-century Canadian LGBT people